Helicia grandifolia is a species of plant in the family Proteaceae. It is endemic to Vietnam.

References

grandifolia
Endemic flora of Vietnam
Trees of Vietnam
Vulnerable plants
Taxonomy articles created by Polbot